Hemingway's Adventures of a Young Man is a 1962 American adventure film directed by Martin Ritt based on Ernest Hemingway's semi-autobiographical character Nick Adams, and featuring Richard Beymer as Adams. A.E. Hotchner wrote the screenplay, originally calling the film Ernest Hemingway's "Young Man". The cast includes Diane Baker, Jessica Tandy, Ricardo Montalbán, Eli Wallach, Arthur Kennedy and Paul Newman. It was released in July 1962.

Licensing
Producer Jerry Wald negotiated with Hemingway to license his short stories: "Indian Camp", "The Doctor and the Doctor's Wife", "The End of Something", "The Three-Day Blow", "The Battler", "A Very Short Story", "In Another Country", "Now I Lay Me", "A Way You'll Never Be" and "A Pursuit Race". Hemingway had to approve the screenplay during all stages of development.

Plot
Nick Adams is a young, restless man in rural Michigan who wants a good life and to see the world. He leaves his domineering mother and noble but weak physician father on a cross country trip.  In his ramblings he encounters a punch-drunk boxer, a sympathetic telegrapher, and a burlesque show promoter.  Nick applies to be a reporter for a newspaper in New York City, but is told he lacks experience.  While working at a catered banquet, he hears a speech by a beautiful woman soliciting volunteer ambulance drivers for the Italian Army in World War I, and impulsively signs up.  On arrival, he is assigned a bilingual companion to help him, who cannot believe that Nick would volunteer for such a posting.  They experience battlefield horrors, Nick is injured, and falls in love with his nurse, who then falls ill herself and dies at the moment they are taking their bedside wedding vows. Finally returning home to his family, he is stunned to hear that his father had died after worrying about Nick.

Cast

Production
Jerry Wald and A. E. Hotchner approached Hemingway seeking the rights to either Across the River and Into the Trees or the Nick Adams stories. Hemingway did not want to sell rights to his novel and was only keen on selling one Nick Adams story. Hotchner pitched to buy the rights for 10 of the 19 stories. Hemingway agreed provided certain conditions were met, including ensuring that "Nick was a good boy."

Jerry Wald said he and director Martin Ritt agreed that Richard Beymer was "the young actor I think stands the best chance of being the next Gary Cooper."

Filming started 25 September 1961 in Mellen, Wisconsin and wound up in 22 January in Verona, Italy. Interiors were supposed to be shot at Centro Sperimentale di Cinematografia in Rome, but that facility was taken up by the production of Cleopatra (1963), forcing Hemingway's to finish its studio work back in the United States.

Jerry Wald died just before the film was released.

References

External links
 
 
 
 

1962 films
1962 drama films
20th Century Fox films
American coming-of-age films
American drama films
1960s English-language films
Films scored by Franz Waxman
Films based on works by Ernest Hemingway
Films directed by Martin Ritt
Films set in the 1910s
CinemaScope films
1960s American films